Ripley’s Believe It or Not! Annual is a hardback reference book of unusual stories and images. The books consist of hundreds of snippets and longer in-depth articles, illustrated with glossy photographs. Twelve books have been produced since 2005 and they are published worldwide by Ripley Publishing. The Ripley’s annual has featured on the New York Times bestseller list on multiple occasions.

Published annuals
Ripley’s Believe It or Not! (2005) 
Planet Eccentric (2006) 
Expect the Unexpected (2007) 
The Remarkable Revealed (2008) 
Prepare to be Shocked (2009) 
Seeing is Believing (2010) 
Enter If You Dare! (2011) 
Strikingly True (2012) 
Download the Weird (2013) 
Dare to Look! (2014) 
Reality Shock! (2015) 
Eye-popping Oddities (2016) 
Unlock the Weird (2017) 
Shatter Your Senses! (2018) 
A Century of Strange (UK title: A Whirlwind of Weird) (2019) 
Beyond the Bizarre (UK title: All Weird! All True) (2020) 
Mind Blown (2021) 
Out of the Box (UK title: All True! All Weird! All Wild!) (2022) 
Escape the Ordinary (2023)

Upcoming annuals 

Level Up (2024)

In the US, the year is not included on the cover of the book. In the UK, it is.

Notable individuals featured
Guinness Rishi
Chayne Hultgren: "The Space Cowboy"
Brian Dettmer  
Herbert Nitsch 
Ueli Gegenschatz 
Khagendra Thapa Magar
Erik Sprague

References

External links
 2011 book review

Ripley's Believe It or Not!